The Arc was a greyhound racing competition held at Swindon Stadium. It was inaugurated in 1987 at Walthamstow Stadium but when the track closed in 2008 the event switched to Swindon.

In 2018 Swindon announced that the event would be staged at a different time due to building work but this never materialised and the competition came to an end.

Past winners

Venues & Distances 
1987-2008 (Walthamstow, 475m)
2007-2017 (Swindon, 480m)

Sponsors
1994-1994 Racing Post
1998-1998 UK Packaging
2009-2009 Blue Square
2010-2010 Betfair
2012-2012 Ladbrokes
2013-2014 Pin Point Recruitment
2015-2017 Calne Racing

References

Greyhound racing competitions in the United Kingdom
Sport in the London Borough of Waltham Forest
Recurring sporting events established in 1987
Sport in Swindon
Greyhound racing in London